Jing Chao (born 15 April 1986) is a Chinese actor.

Life
Jing was born in Shanghai, China on 15 April 1986. He graduated from Beijing Film Academy. He married actress Li Jialin (李佳璘), also known as Li Lin, in 2014. They have two children.

Career
In 2009, Jing Chao starred in the modern romance drama Love With My Former Wife, and became known for his role as "Jiao Yin". He then made his film debut in the psychological thriller Case Sensitive in 2011.

In 2013, Jing was cast as the leading role in the youth police drama Sunshine Police.

In 2014, Jing became known for his role in the crime thriller web drama Death Notify.

In 2015, Jing played lead roles in the science fiction web drama Falling Down, and military drama Youth Assemble.

In 2016, Jing starred in the metropolitan drama We Are The Best Ten Years directed by Guan Hu. The same year, he featured in the xianxia drama Chinese Paladin 5, and also starred in the hit spy drama Decoded.

In 2017, Jing played the leading role in the television series Mo Du Feng Yun, a drama about the life of a legendary magician.

In 2018, Jing starred in the modern romance drama Here to Heart.  He then starred in the crime web series Medical Examiner Dr. Qin as the lead character, Qin Ming.
The same year, he gained increased recognition and popularity with his role as Ling Yunche in the historical fiction drama  Ruyi's Royal Love in the Palace.

In 2019, Jing starred in the historical romance drama Princess Silver.  The same year, he was cast in the historical drama The Legend of Xiao Chuo, portraying Yelü Xian.

Filmography

Film

Television series

Awards and nominations

References 

1986 births
Living people
Male actors from Shanghai
Beijing Film Academy alumni
21st-century Chinese male actors
Chinese male television actors
Chinese male film actors